Chris Cruikshank (born 12 May 1985) is a New Zealand cricketer. He played in one List A and one Twenty20 match for Central Districts in 2007.

See also
 List of Central Districts representative cricketers

References

External links
 

1985 births
Living people
New Zealand cricketers
Central Districts cricketers
Cricketers from Hāwera